Goran Antunovič (born 2 March 1989 in Komárno) is a Slovak football midfielder who currently plays for MŠK Hurbanovo.

FK DAC 1904 Dunajská Streda
He made his professional debut for FK DAC 1904 Dunajská Streda against ŠK Slovan Bratislava on 12 July 2013.

References

External links
Corgoň Liga profile
DAC Dunajská Streda profile
Eurofotbal profile

External links
 

1989 births
Living people
Slovak people of Serbian descent
Slovak footballers
Footballers from Novi Sad
Association football midfielders
KFC Komárno players
ŠK Senec players
FC ŠTK 1914 Šamorín players
TJ Baník Ružiná players
FC DAC 1904 Dunajská Streda players
Slovak Super Liga players